The 1977 Wisconsin Badgers football team represented the University of Wisconsin–Madison in the 1977 Big Ten Conference football season.

Schedule

Roster

1978 NFL Draft

References

Wisconsin
Wisconsin Badgers football seasons
Wisconsin Badgers football